

Wilhelm “Willi" Fey (25 September 1918 – 29 April 2002) was a WWII German panzer ace. During World War II, he served in the armoured troops of the Waffen-SS, destroying many enemy armored vehicles. In the Normandy battles during the summer of 1944 he was credited with the destruction of 69 allied tanks. Fey also served in the Battle Of The Bulge and on the Eastern Front. 

Following the war, Fey served in the Bundeswehr. He wrote an account of his combat experiences titled (English edition) Armor Battles Of The Waffen SS: 1943-45.

Awards
 Knight's Cross of the Iron Cross on 29 April 1945 as SS-Oberscharführer and Panzer commander in the schwere SS-Panzer-Abteilung 502

Bibliography

External links
 

1918 births
2002 deaths
Recipients of the Knight's Cross of the Iron Cross
Panzer commanders
Waffen-SS personnel
German Army personnel
People from Giessen (district)
SS non-commissioned officers
Recipients of the Gold German Cross
Military personnel from Hesse